Mining Institute may refer to:

 Moscow State Mining University, Russia, also known as the Moscow Mining Institute
 Saint Petersburg Mining Institute, Russia, also known as the Mining Academy
 Mining Institute of Cornwall, United Kingdom
 North of England Institute of Mining and Mechanical Engineers, United Kingdom, known locally as the Mining Institute
 Geological and Mining Institute of Spain, a research institute in Madrid, Spain